John DeSantis, sometimes credited as John De Santis or John Desantis, (born November 13, 1973) is a Canadian actor, best known as Lurch on Fox Family's television of The New Addams Family. His other work includes a principal role in Disney's Touchstone Pictures film The 13th Warrior, in which he played a Viking warrior named Ragnar the Dour. He has also appeared in television series Police Academy and Supernatural.

Filmography

References

External links

Living people
Canadian male film actors
Canadian male television actors
Canadian male voice actors
Canadian people of Italian descent
1973 births